No Creek may refer to:

No Creek (Kentucky), a stream in Ohio County
No Creek (Missouri), a stream in Livingston and Grundy counties